Evans is an unincorporated community in Stevens County, Washington, United States. Evans has a post office with ZIP code 99126.

Evans was named in 1901 for local quarry owner J.H. Evans.

References

Unincorporated communities in Stevens County, Washington
Unincorporated communities in Washington (state)
Populated places established in 1901
Washington (state) populated places on the Columbia River